is a Japanese former professional cyclist. He won the Tour de Okinawa in 2009.

Major results
2009
1st Overall Tour de Okinawa
1st Stage 2
2010
2nd Tour de Okinawa

References

External links
 
 
 

1988 births
Living people
Japanese male cyclists